Leptaxis wollastoni is an endangered species of air-breathing land snail, a terrestrial pulmonate gastropod mollusk in the family Helicidae, the typical snails. This species is endemic to Madeira (Porto Santo and Ilhéu de Fora).

References

Endemic fauna of Madeira
Molluscs of Europe
Leptaxis
Gastropods described in 1852
Taxonomy articles created by Polbot